Placochilus is a genus of insects in the family Miridae, the plant bugs.

Species
Species within this genus include:
Placochilus paraseladonicus Qi and Nonnaizab, 1995
Placochilus seladonicus (Fallén, 1807)

References

Mirinae
Miridae genera